Jorunna spazzola is a species of sea slug, a dorid nudibranch, a shell-less marine gastropod mollusc in the family Discodorididae.

Taxonomy
It is possibly synonymous with Jorunna luisae.

Camacho-García et al. (2014) suggested Caribbean animals identified as Jorunna spazzola could constitute a distinct species, because they display external differences with the original description from southern Brazil.

Distribution
This species was described from Brazil. The distribution of Jorunna spazzola includes Florida, Honduras, Costa Rica, Venezuela, Cuba, Curaçao, Barbados, Virgin Islands, Turks and Caicos, Brazil and Panama.

Description
The body is oval. The mantle is rigid. Dorsum is flattened and covered with small caryophyllidia. Branchial leaves are very short. Background color is translucent gray with a few darker gray or brown patches over the dorsum. Mantle margin is surrounded by small opaque white glands. Rhinophores and gill are the same color as the rest of the body. It is up to 18 mm long or up to is 36 mm.

According to Rudman (2008), this species is known mostly from internal characters and needs clarification.

Ecology 
Minimum recorded depth is 0 m. Maximum recorded depth is 1.5 m. It was found under rocks in Panama.

Prey of Jorunna spazzola include sponges of the order Haplosclerida: Callyspongia pallida and Chalinula sp. It is well camouflaged on its prey. This species is able to quickly change colors as a response to unknown environmental cues.

References
This article incorporates Creative Commons (CC-BY-4.0) text from the reference

External links

Discodorididae
Gastropods described in 1955
Taxa named by Ernst Marcus (zoologist)